Thomas J. Kennett is a retired United States Air Force major general who has served as the Air National Guard Assistant to the commander of Air Mobility Command.

References

External links

Year of birth missing (living people)
Living people
Place of birth missing (living people)
United States Air Force generals